FC Ural Yekaterinburg is a Russian association football club based in Yekaterinburg. They play in the Russian Premier League.

History

The club was founded in 1930 and was known as Avangard (1930–1948, 1953–1957), Zenit (1944–1946), Mashinostroitel (1958–1959), and Uralmash (1949–1952, 1960–2002). The club is currently named after the Russian region of Ural, where Yekaterinburg is the capital.

The club participated in the Soviet championships beginning in 1945. They mostly played in the higher leagues, with the exception of the 1969 season spent in the lowest league. They were the easternmost Russian SFSR club to compete in the third Soviet division (the easternmost Soviet club overall was FC Kairat from Alma-Ata, Kazakh SSR).

Uralmash reached the quarterfinals of the Soviet Cup in 1965/66, 1967/68, and 1990/91.

After the dissolution of the USSR, Uralmash were entitled to enter the Russian Top Division and played there for five seasons, from 1992 to 1996. Their best result was eighth position in 1993 and 1995. Despite reaching the semifinal of the Intertoto Cup in 1996, Uralmash finished 16th out of 18 in the league and were relegated. In 1997 another relegation followed, now to the Second Division. From 1998 to 2002 Uralmash played in the Second Division. After winning promotion, the club was renamed Ural. In 2003, the team were relegated from the Russian First Division, but were promoted again after the 2004 season. The team's best finish in the First Division was third in 2006.

Domestic

Current squads

First team

Out on loan

Reserve team

Retired numbers
 23 –  Pyotr Khrustovsky, forward (2003) – posthumous honor

Coaching staff
Head coach – Yuri Matveyev
Assistant coach – Vladimir Kalashnikov, Andrei Danilov,  Ivan Jovanovski
Goalkeeping coach – Andrei Shpilyov

Notable players
Had international caps for their respective countries. Players whose name is listed in bold represented their countries while playing for Ural/Uralmash.

Russia/USSR
 Viktor Shishkin
 Nikita Chernov
 Yury Gazinsky
 Yuri Matveyev
 Roman Pavlyuchenko
 Aleksandr Podshivalov
 Aleksandr Ryazantsev
 Oleg Shatov
 Igor Smolnikov
 Fyodor Smolov
 Oleg Veretennikov
 Dmitry Yefremov
 Artyom Yenin
 Aleksandr Yerokhin
 Anton Zabolotny
 Denis Zubko

Former USSR countries
Armenia

 Artak Aleksanyan
 Edgar Manucharyan
 Artur Sarkisov
 Varazdat Haroyan

Belarus

 Andrey Chukhley
 Alyaksandr Hrapkowski
 Alyaksandr Martynovich
 Nikolay Zolotov
 Aleh Shkabara
 Yuri Zhevnov
Estonia

 Aleksandr Dmitrijev

Georgia

 Giorgi Chanturia

Kazakhstan

 Vitaliy Abramov
 Sergei Anashkin
 Renat Dubinskiy
 Vitaliy Kafanov
 Konstantin Ledovskikh
 Aleksandr Sklyarov
 Georgy Zhukov

Lithuania

 Arūnas Klimavičius
 Robertas Poškus

Moldova

 Igor Bugaiov
 Serghei Rogaciov

Tajikistan

 Vitaliy Levchenko
 Igor Vityutnev
 Anatoli Volovodenko
 Shamsiddin Shanbiev

Ukraine

 Denys Kulakov
 Oleksandr Pomazun
 Dmytro Topchiev

Uzbekistan
 Vladimir Radkevich
 Yevgeni Safonov
 Vladimir Shishelov
 Oston Urunov

Europe
Hungary

 Vladimir Koman

Iceland

 Sölvi Ottesen

Israel

 Toto Tamuz

Norway

 Stefan Strandberg

Poland

 Rafał Augustyniak 
 Michał Kucharczyk
 Maciej Wilusz

Romania

 Eric Bicfalvi
South America

Chile
 Gerson Acevedo

Africa

Cameroon

 Petrus Boumal

Congo

 Emmerson

Zambia

 Chisamba Lungu

Managers

 Pavel Gusev (2003–04)
 Aleksandr Pobegalov (2005–09)
 Vladimir Fedotov (2009–10)
 Boris Stukalov (2010)
 Dmitriy Ogai (2011)
 Yuri Matveyev (2011)
 Aleksandr Pobegalov (2012)
 Sergei Bulatov (2012)
 Pavel Gusev (2012–13)
 Oleg Vasilenko (2013)
 Aleksandr Tarkhanov (2013–15)
 Viktor Goncharenko (2015)
 Vadim Skripchenko (2015–2016)

Honours

Domestic
Soviet Second League / Russian Football National League
Champions (2): 1990, 2012–13
Russian Second Division
Champions (2): 2002, 2004
Russian Cup
Runners-up (2): 2016–17, 2018–19

Invitational
ANFA Cup
Champions (1): 1989

References

External links

Official website 

 
Association football clubs established in 1930
Ural Sverdlovsk Oblast
Sports clubs in Yekaterinburg
1930 establishments in Russia
Soviet Top League clubs